The siege of Al-Dāmūs was a battle of the Reconquista that occurred in the year 1210. The forces of the Kingdom of Aragon, together with auxiliary forces of the Knights Templar and Knights Hospitaller, were pitted against the defending forces of the Almohades. The Christian forces defeated the Muslim defenders.  This battle was significant because in taking the castle at Ademuz, the Christian forces riled their Muslim opponents to initiate a grand offensive that would eventually culminate in the Battle of Las Navas de Tolosa.  This offensive, in turn, marked the end of the Islamic domination of the region and the beginning of Christian rule in the province.

Context 
In 1210, the Almohad Empire, who controlled the Balearic Islands (conquered in 1203), launched a great incursion into the Catalan coast led by Abubola the Elder. The Muslim forces, being the combined forces from the Maghreb and Al-Andalus, disembarked and began pillaging the countryside seizing much booty and captives in the process.

In March 1210, in response to the Almohad incursion, King Peter II of Aragon, who was at the time in the city of Monzón, gathered an army to attack the Moors of the Taifa of Valencia. Within the objectives of this campaign lay Al-Dāmūs (Spanish: Ademuz), one of the fortresses that formed the defensive net of the Turia River.

Siege 
In the middle of 1210, Al-Dāmūs was conquered by Peter II of Aragon with the help of the Knights Hospitaller and the Knights Templar.

Among the knights who participated in the campaign were Ramón de Castillazuelo, Bishop of Zaragoza, García de Gúdal, Bishop of Osca, García Frontín I, Bishop of Tarazona, Jimeno Cornel, García Romeo, Artal II de Alagón, Blasco Romeo, Pero Sesé, Ato I de Foces, Guillem I de Cervelló, Guillem de Peralta, Arnaldo Palacín, Arnaldo de Alascó, Adam de Alascó, Don Atorella, Sancho de Antillón, Guillem III de Montcada, Guillem Ramon III de Montcada, Seneschal of Catalonia, and Guillem d'Òdena. From the Templars was Pedro de Montagut.

Consequences 
The offensive continued until the Christian forces finally took the Castle of Serreilla.

Pedro del Pomar was charged by King Peter II of Aragon to repopulate all the lands won by the conquest with Christians from the surrounding kingdoms.

The loss of Ademuz and the devastation caused by the campaign, troubled the Almohades so much that they sent a delegation of nobles from Xarq al-Ándalus to Marrakech to beg Muhammad al-Nasir for reinforcements.  This was one of the motivating factors that led to the launch of the Muslim expedition that would culminate in the Battle of Las Navas de Tolosa in 1212. This would in turn end the supremacy of Al-Andalus in the Iberian Peninsula.

The fortress fell into Almohad hands later in 1210 in an offensive that also recaptured Castielfabib, but failed to reach Moya.

See also
 Knights Hospitaller
 Knights Templar
 Peter II of Aragon
 Reconquista

References

 The information and sources of this article were translated from its Spanish equivalent.

Bibliography 
 Eslava Blasco, Raúl: Ademuz y su patrimonio histórico-artístico. Ademuz, 2007. 

1210 in Europe
Dāmūs
Damus
Damus
Al-Damus
Damus
Damus
13th century in Aragon
Damus
13th century in Al-Andalus
Dāmūs